Olufunke Baruwa is a Nigerian gender and development practitioner, feminist and public speaker with a focus on gender, public policy and governance. For more than two decades, she has been at the forefront of social policies and reforms in Nigeria working with government, civil society and international development partners.

Education
Baruwa was educated at the University of Abuja (BSc) and the University of Nigeria, Nsukka (MBA), and completed further courses at the University of East Anglia and the University of York.

Career 
Baruwa is renowned for her advocacy on the inclusion of women in strategic political, social and economic positions in Nigeria. From 2000 to 2015, she was a program officer at the defunct National Poverty Eradication Programme, gender advisor at the Office of the Senior Special Assistant to the President on MDGs, and as a technical assistant on research, policy and planning in the Ministry of Communication Technology. In 2015, she was appointed as the chief executive officer of the Nigerian Women's Trust Fund Nigerian Women Trust Fund – a technical and financial resource for women in politics and decision-making in Nigeria, where she set the strategic vision and mobilized resources succeeding Ayisha Osori. Prior to assuming the role of CEO of the Nigerian Women's Trust Fund she served on the board of directors of the fund from 2011 to 2015. and in 2018, she was appointed co-chair of the board of directors, succeeding Amina Salihu. That same year, she joined the US Agency for International Development (USAID) / Nigeria as the Civil Society and Media Specialist in their Peace & Democratic Governance Office.

In 2020, Olufunke Baruwa started working in Ford Foundation’s West Africa Office as program officer for gender, racial and ethnic justice, where she leads work on ending violence against women and girls.

Recognition 
Named as one of the ‘17 women changing the world’ by the Institute for Inclusive Development at its 2015 Colloquium held at the Harvard Kennedy School of Government in Cambridge, Massachusetts, Baruwa is a member of the Women Waging Peace Network.

She has been recognized for her work with Nigerian Women's Trust Fund by The Guardian, She Leads Africa, and other publications.

In 2021, Baruwa was one of the Nigerian transformational leaders participating in Harvard University's Nigeria in The World seminar series where she spoke about Nigerian individuals and groups working to address gender-based violence in Nigeria and West Africa.

Personal life 
Baruwa is married with two daughters. She lives in Abuja with her husband.

References

Living people
University of Abuja alumni
University of Nigeria alumni
Nigerian women's rights activists
Alumni of the University of East Anglia
Alumni of the University of York
Nigerian women activists
1976 births
Yoruba women activists